Hegermühle is a railway station in the city of Strausberg in Brandenburg. Located on the Strausberg–Strausberg Nord line, it is served by the S-Bahn line .

History
The Hegermühle halt was opened on 5 October 1984 to serve the newly created settlements in the south of the city of Strausberg. The name of the station is derived from one of the wind and water mills built around Strausberg in the 13th and 14th centuries, as well as the station of the same name and the Schlagmühle station of the Strausberger Eisenbahn.

The trains on the line should originally be handled by video surveillance from Strausberg Stadt station, but this was not possible due to technical defects. Between Strausberg Nord station and Strausberg station there was therefore a mobile supervisor on each train. In the years 1989 to 1991, a public office building for train protection systems was built at the station, also to prevent vandalism. Since then, there has been no mobile supervision on the track anymore.

Notable places nearby
Herrensee

See also
Strausberg Railway
Straussee Ferry
Strausberg station
Strausberg Stadt station
Strausberg Nord station

References

External links

Hegermuhle
Hegermuhle
Berlin S-Bahn stations
Railway stations in Brandenburg
Buildings and structures in Märkisch-Oderland
Railway stations in Germany opened in 1984
1984 establishments in East Germany